David Forrest may refer to:

 David Forrest (academic) (born 1953), applied economist and econometrician
 David Forrest (pseudonym), author
 David Forrest (Australian politician) (1852–1917)
 David P. Forrest, U.S. politician